United Motherland, also known as United Homeland is a political party in the Republic of Artsakh. It was founded on 22 September 2019. Samvel Babayan is the party's founder and leader.

Electoral record 
The party participated in the 2020 Artsakhian general election and won 9 seats out of 33 in the National Assembly.

Ideology 
Prior to the 2020 election, the party pledged its support for presidential candidate Masis Mayilyan. Following the 2020 election, Samvel Babayan announced his support for newly elected President Arayik Harutyunyan. Babayan announced that a political cooperation memorandum would be signed between United Motherland and the Free Motherland - UCA Alliance. Babayan also proclaimed that his party would seek to strengthen security, social welfare and would create a new political culture in Artsakh where freedom of expression will be a priority.

See also 

 List of political parties in Artsakh

References

External links
United Motherland

Political parties in the Republic of Artsakh
Political parties established in 2019
2019 establishments in Armenia